Bratonci is a village in the Municipality of Beltinci in the Prekmurje region of northeastern Slovenia. Črnec Creek, a tributary of the Ledava, flows through the settlement.

There is a small church in the settlement. It was built in 1898 and is dedicated to Mary Help of Christians and belongs to the Parish of Beltinci.

The writer István Kühár was born in Bratonci.

References

External links 
Bratonci on Geopedia

Populated places in the Municipality of Beltinci